Gregorio Elso Pérez Perdigón (born 16 January 1948 in Maldonado) is a Uruguayan football manager and former player who played as a midfielder.

Pérez is widely reputed in his country due for his respectful approach toward the game and general sportsmanship. He is known as "Don Gregorio".

Career as a manager
Gregorio Perez also acted as an assistant manager to Oscar Tabarez during the Uruguayan national football team's 1990 Football World Cup campaign.

References

1948 births
Living people
Uruguayan footballers
Association football midfielders
Defensor Sporting players
Uruguayan football managers
C.A. Progreso managers
Defensor Sporting managers
Rampla Juniors managers
Central Español managers
Montevideo Wanderers managers
Club de Gimnasia y Esgrima La Plata managers
Peñarol managers
Club Atlético Independiente managers
Cagliari Calcio managers
Olimpo managers
Danubio F.C. managers
Argentinos Juniors managers
Club Olimpia managers
Club Libertad managers
Deportes Tolima managers
Independiente Santa Fe managers
Club Universitario de Deportes managers
Uruguayan expatriate football managers
Uruguayan expatriate sportspeople in Argentina
Uruguayan expatriate sportspeople in Italy
Uruguayan expatriate sportspeople in Paraguay
Uruguayan expatriate sportspeople in Peru
Uruguayan expatriate sportspeople in Colombia
Expatriate football managers in Argentina
Expatriate football managers in Italy
Expatriate football managers in Paraguay
Expatriate football managers in Peru
Expatriate football managers in Colombia